Septoria ampelina is a fungal plant pathogen.

References

External links 
 Index Fungorum
 USDA ARS Fungal Database

ampelina
Fungal plant pathogens and diseases
Fungi described in 1874